The Mortlake Power Station is a 566 MW open cycle gas-fired power station developed by Origin Energy, located 12 km west of Mortlake, Victoria.

Construction of the $640 million power station began in 2008. It was initially due to be operational in 2010, and was completed in August 2012.

The plant is located on approximately 20 hectares of land with an extensive buffer zone around it. It is adjacent to the existing Moorabool to Heywood 500 kV high voltage transmission line. The plant is supplied with natural gas via an 83 km dedicated underground natural gas transmission pipeline from the Otway Gas Plant near Port Campbell, as part of the offshore Otway Gas Project.

One of the major assets that takes power from this station in at times is the Alcoa Portland Smelter.

References

External links
 Electricity generation – Origin Energy

Natural gas-fired power stations in Victoria (Australia)